Rivington Arms was an art gallery in New York City.

Melissa Bent and Mirabelle Marden (daughter of artists Helen and Brice Marden) founded the gallery as a small storefront on Rivington Street in 2001, part of a new wave of galleries opening in the Lower East Side. In 2005, it moved to a larger space on East 2nd Street.

The gallery participates in the following art fairs: The Armory Show, Frieze, NADA, and VOLTAshow.

It was announced on November 5, 2008 in Artforum that due to business differences, Rivington Arms would be closing its location in January 2009 after they attended the Frieze Art Fair in London.

Artists represented
Uri Aran
Darren Bader
Mathew Cerletty
John Finneran
Shara Hughes
Lansing-Dreiden
Hanna Liden
Carter Mull
Dash Snow
Pinar Yolacan

References

External links

New York Times Review
 Art in Review; Darren Bader retrieved from The New York Times website
A Farewell to Arms
Uri Aran: Geraniums The Brooklyn rail
Future Greats, ArtReview - Uri Aran Posted by ArtReview magazine on March 2009

2001 establishments in New York City
2009 disestablishments in New York (state)
Contemporary art galleries in the United States
Defunct art museums and galleries in Manhattan
Art galleries established in 2001
Art galleries disestablished in 2009